The 1983 Cornell Big Red football team was an American football team that represented Cornell University during the 1983 NCAA Division I-AA football season. Cornell finished fifth in the Ivy League. 

In its first season under head coach Maxie Baughan, the team compiled a 3–6–1 record and was outscored 268 to 161. Brad Decker and Frank Farace, Mark Miller and Mike Scully were the team captains. 

Cornell's 3–3–1 conference record placed fifth in the Ivy League standings. The Big Red outscored Ivy opponents 134 to 119. 

Cornell played its home games at Schoellkopf Field in Ithaca, New York.

Schedule

References

Cornell
Cornell Big Red football seasons
Cornell Big Red football